Bette Lowes is the former mayor of Baldwin Park, California.

Lowes served as the city's mayor until 1999 when she was defeated by Manuel Lozano.

References

Living people
Mayors of places in California
People from Baldwin Park, California
Women mayors of places in California
Year of birth missing (living people)
21st-century American women